Jürgen Sparwasser (born 4 June 1948 in Halberstadt) is a retired German football player and later briefly a football manager.

Sparwasser started his playing career in the youth department of his hometown club BSG Lokomotive Halberstadt in 1956. In 1965 he moved to 1. FC Magdeburg where he gave his senior debut in January 1966. He would stay with the club until 1979, when a hip injury ended his career. He played in 271 DDR-Oberliga matches as a midfielder, scoring 111 goals. When Magdeburg had been relegated to the second-tier DDR-Liga at the end of the 1965–66 season, Sparwasser was an integral part in winning immediate repromotion, scoring 22 goals in 27 matches. He also played 40 matches in various European competitions. He was part of the team that won the UEFA Cup Winners' Cup in 1974.

Between 1969 and 1977 Sparwasser played in 49 matches for East Germany, scoring 14 goals. As a member of the Olympic team in 1972, he played in 7 matches and scored 5 goals. He won a shared bronze medal for his native country. He also made six appearances for East Germany at the 1974 FIFA World Cup finals, where he gained fame for scoring the winning goal in a politically prestigious match against West Germany.

This goal was exploited politically, but Sparwasser did not profit from it. As he said later: "Rumor had it I was richly rewarded for the goal, with a car, a house and a cash premium. But that is not true." In 1988, Sparwasser defected to West Germany while taking part in a veterans' tournament there.

After his playing career he had a brief managerial career, working as assistant manager at Eintracht Frankfurt in 1988 and 1989 and as head coach at SV Darmstadt 98 in 1990 and 1991.

Career statistics

International goals

Honours
 UEFA Cup Winners' Cup: 1
 Winner 1974
 DDR-Oberliga: 3
 Champion 1971–72, 1973–74, 1974–75
 FDGB-Pokal: 4
 Winner 1969, 1973, 1978, 1979
 Olympic football tournament
 Bronze medal Munich 1972

References

1948 births
Living people
People from Halberstadt
German footballers
East German footballers
German football managers
1974 FIFA World Cup players
Footballers at the 1972 Summer Olympics
Olympic footballers of East Germany
Olympic bronze medalists for East Germany
East Germany international footballers
VfB Germania Halberstadt players
1. FC Magdeburg players
East German defectors
Eintracht Frankfurt non-playing staff
Olympic medalists in football
SV Darmstadt 98 managers
East German emigrants to West Germany
DDR-Oberliga players
Medalists at the 1972 Summer Olympics
Association football midfielders
Footballers from Saxony-Anhalt
People from Bezirk Magdeburg